The Uila is a right tributary of the river Luț in Romania. It discharges into the Luț in Goreni.

References

Rivers of Romania
Rivers of Mureș County